Benjamin Gaulon (born 1979) is an artist whose work focuses on planned obsolescence, consumerism and disposable society. He has previously released work under the name "recyclism".

Biography
Benjamin Gaulon received a degree in Visual Communication from l'École Supérieure des Arts Décoratifs de Strasbourg and a MFA in Interactive Media & Environment from the Frank Mohr Institute. During his time at the Frank Mohr Institute, he developed several high-profile projects, including de Pong Game, the Recycling Entertainment System, The PrintBall and Corrupt.

After Graduating Gaulon started leading D.A.T.A (Dublin Art and Technology Association) and co-founded the Irish Museum of Contemporary Art (IMOCA) in 2007. Since 2005, in collaboration with Lourens Rozema, Gaulon is running workshops entitled the e-waste workshops, inviting participants to create art projects from recycled electronic waste.

Between 2006 and 2013, Gaulon taught several courses at the National College of Art and Design on topics such as visual programming, physical computing, new media art and digital art theory. Gaulon currently lives in Dublin with his wife and daughter.

Notable projects
 Digitalrecycling: online community project.
 de Pong Game: augmented architecture interactive projection.
 The PrintBall: Graffiti Robot (with Géraud de Bizien)
 Corrupt: Online software.
 Recycling Entertainment System: interactive installation.
 2.4 kHz Project: Wireless video surveillance hacking.
 Hard Drivin': Twitter controlled installation. (with Ivan Twohig and Brian Solon)
 ReFunct Media: Hardware Hacking Installation.

Exhibitions
Selected exhibitions, screenings and performances include:
 2011, Resonate – Belgrade – Serbia
 2011, C4 Contemporary Art – Los Angeles – USA
 2011, Flux Factory – New York City – USA
 2011, R.I.P. – Recycling Pervasive Media, Intervening in Planned Obsolescence – Banff – Canada
 2011, New York Electronic Art Festival 2011 – Harvestworks – NYC – USA
 2011, Bent Festival 2011 – NYC – USA
 2011, Filtering Failure, Amsterdam, The Netherlands
 2010, BLK River Festival, Vienna, Austria
 2010, Les Grandes Traversées 2010, Royan, Soulac, Bordeaux, France
 2010, Arts Research: Publics and Purposes conference, GradCam, Temple Bar Gallery, Dublin, Republic of Ireland
 2009, International Symposium on Electronic Art 2009, Dublin, Republic of Ireland
 2009, ISEA 2009, The LAB, Dublin, Republic of Ireland
 2008, Dublin Electronic Art Festival 2008, Dublin, Republic of Ireland
 2008, Square Eyes Festival, Arnhem, The Netherlands
 2008, TECHNOTHREADS, The Science Gallery, Trinity College. Dublin, Republic of Ireland
 2008, Lightwave08, The Science Gallery, Trinity College. Dublin, Republic of Ireland
 2007, Dublin Electronic Art Festival 2007, Dublin, Republic of Ireland
 2007, Cluster, Gallery la Chaufferie, École Supérieure des Art Décoratifs de Strasbourg, France
 2007, Come out and Play, Amsterdam, The Netherlands
 2007, Sous la Plage, Paris, France
 2006, SUPERFLUX, Gallery Roger Tator, Lyon, France
 2006, €10000 SHOW, W139, Amsterdam, The Netherlands
 2006, Art Rock, Inter-disciplinary Festival, St Brieuc, France
 2005, Ososphere Festival, Strasbourg, France
 2005, Axis Festival, Assen, The Netherlands
 2004, Cite Rap Festival N.6, St Brieuc, France
 2004, Festival Sonic Acts X Unsorted, Amsterdam, The Netherlands

References

External links
 Official website recyclism.com
 Corrupt
 E-Waste Workshop Official website

1979 births
French conceptual artists
Living people
New media artists
Academics of the National College of Art and Design